The 2013 Baltic Chain Tour was the third edition of the Baltic Chain Tour road cycling race. It was held over a period of six days between 19 and 25 May 2013. The race was a part of the 2013 UCI Europe Tour with a race classification of 2.2.

Schedule

Teams

Stages

Stage 1
19 August 2013 – Lahti,

Stage 2
20 August 2013 – Tallinn to Viljandi,

Stage 3
21 August 2013 – Viljandi to Otepää,

Stage 4
22 August 2013 – Smiltene to Sigulda,

Stage 5
24 August 2013 – Panevėžys to Utena,

Stage 6
25 August 2013 – Utena to Vilnius,

Classification leadership table

Final standings

General classification

Sprint classification

Mountains classification

Young riders classification

Team classification

References

2013 UCI Europe Tour
2013 in Latvian sport
2013 in Estonian sport
2013 in Lithuanian sport
2013 in Finnish sport
Baltic Chain Tour